The New York Red Bulls U-23 is an American soccer team based in Harrison, New Jersey. Founded in 2009, the team plays in USL League Two, a national amateur league at the fourth tier of the American Soccer Pyramid. It is part of the official Development Academy of Major League Soccer's New York Red Bulls.

The team plays its home games at the Red Bull Training Facility in Hanover, New Jersey. The team's colors are red, blue and white.

History

2009–2013
The New York Red Bulls U-23 team was formed in 2009 by Major League Soccer team New York Red Bulls. The team is the senior club in the New York Red Bulls Academy system.

The New York Red Bulls U-23 first entered National Premier Soccer League play in 2010. In its first season, the team finished first in the Atlantic Conference, but lost to FC Sonic Lehigh Valley in the playoffs.

2014 
After a perfect 12–0 regular season, New York Red Bulls U-23 defeated two Northeast Region opponents to earn their spot in the NPSL Final Four. A 2–0 victory over Lansing United in the semifinals earned a place in the NPSL Final, where they defeated Chattanooga FC 3–1 at Red Bull Arena winning the 2014 NPSL Championship.

Year-by-year

Honors

Domestic
Premier Development League
 Runner-Up: 2015
PDL Regular Season
 Winner: 2017
Eastern Conference
 Winner: 2015
 Mid-Atlantic Division
 Winner: 2015, 2017
National Premier Soccer League
 Champions: 2014
Northeast Region
 Winner: 2014
 North Atlantic Conference:
 Winner: 2010, 2012, 2014

Head coaches
  Bob Montgomery (2010–2012)
  Simon Nee (2013–2014)
  Rob Elliott (2015–present)

Stadium
 Lubetkin Field at J. Malcolm Simon Stadium at New Jersey Institute of Technology; Newark, New Jersey (2010–2013)
 Red Bull Training Facility; Hanover, New Jersey (2014–present)
MSU Soccer Park at Pittser Field at Montclair State University; Montclair, New Jersey (2017–present; select games)

References

External links
 New York Red Bulls U-23 at Premier Development League
 Red Bulls Academy official website

Association football clubs established in 2009
National Premier Soccer League teams
Soccer clubs in New Jersey
 
2009 establishments in New Jersey
USL League Two teams
Reserve soccer teams in the United States